East Dallas, also referred to by the East Dallas Chamber of Commerce as the Lake & Garden District, is an expansive area of numerous communities and neighborhoods in Dallas, Texas (United States) that border nearby suburban cities to the east such as Garland, Mesquite, and Balch Springs, Texas.

White Rock Lake, located in the center of East Dallas, is considered "the crown jewel of the Dallas parks system". The lake, along with the Dallas Arboretum and Botanical Garden located on the east side of the lake, have strongly influenced and shaped the identity of the East Dallas area.

Geography

Overview
East Dallas is bounded by Northwest Highway on the north, Garland and Mesquite on the east, Bruton Road on the south, and Central Expressway on the west. East Dallas touches Highland Park, University Park, and Uptown on the west, North Dallas and Lake Highlands on the north, Garland and Mesquite on the east, and South and Southeast Dallas on the south.

Neighborhoods 

Due to East Dallas stretching across a large section of the city, the locations of neighborhoods are generally categorized into smaller sub-areas. The neighborhoods in the following sub-areas are considered part of East Dallas:

Greater Lakewood/M-Streets area
Often, neighborhoods in East Dallas located west of White Rock Lake are generally grouped under the heading of the Lakewood or the M-Streets area. Lakewood and Greenland Hills (also known as the M-Streets) are themselves neighborhoods of their own; however due to their prominence, the surrounding neighborhoods are generalized as belonging to one of the neighborhoods. Skillman Street is often used as a dividing line between the Greater M-Street and Greater Lakewood areas, as the road is also the dividing line for the 75206 and 75214 zip codes.

Abrams-Brookside
Belmont
Caruth Terrace
The Cloisters
East Garrett Park
Edgemont Park
Glencoe Park
Greenland Hills (M Streets)
Hillside
Hollywood Heights
Junius Heights
Lakewood
Lakewood Heights
Lakewood Hills
Lakewood Trails
Lower Greenville/Upper Greenville
Merriman Park/University Manor
North Stonewall Terrace
Ridgewood Park
Santa Monica
Stonewall Terrace
Swiss Avenue (partial)
Vickery Place
The Village
White Rock
Wilshire Heights
University Meadows
University Terrace

White Rock area
The area east of the lake is often referred to as the White Rock area. Generally, the neighborhoods in the White Rock area are located in the 75218 zip code.

Casa Linda Estates
Eastwood
Emerald Isles
Enclave at White Rock
Forest Hills
Gaston Park
Highland on the Creek
Lake Park Estates
Little Forest Hills
Lochwood
Old Lake Highlands
The Peninsula

Far East Dallas/Casa View
Generally, the neighborhoods in the Far East Dallas/Casa View area are located in the 75228 zip code.

Alger Park
Ash Creek
Braeburn Glen
Briarwood
Claremont (White Rock Hills)
Casa View
Casa View Haven
Casa View Oaks
Club Mannor
Crestview Park
Fairway Estates
Forest Meade
Forest Oaks
Hillridge (White Rock Hills)
Lakeland Hills (White Rock Hills)
Linda Heights
St. Andrew's
White Rock Forest

Old East Dallas

Old East Dallas, and its neighborhoods, are often viewed as a distinct area from East Dallas.

Baylor-Meadows
Bryan Place
Cityplace
Cochran Heights
Deep Ellum
Fitzhugh-Capitol
Mill Creek
Munger Place
Peak's Suburban Addition
Roseland
Swiss Avenue (partial)

Lower East Dallas
Fair Park, Dallas,Texas
Buckner Terrace, Dallas, Texas
Buckner Park, Dallas, Texas
Parkdale, Dallas, Texas
Urbandale, Dallas, Texas
Arnold Station, Dallas, Texas
Cedar Run, Dallas, Texas
Piedmont, Dallas, Texas
Pleasant Mound, Dallas, Texas
Scyene, Dallas, Texas

Population
A total of 144,008 people lived in the area, according to the 2016 U.S. census estimate. The median age for residents was 35.8

According to the 2016 Census estimate, 65.8% of the population was White, 12.7% was Black, 2.7% Asian, 18.8% from two or more races. 36.6% of the total population was of Hispanic or Latino origin.

48.9% of residents are male, 51.1% are female. 74.3% are age 18 or over. 37.1% have never been married, 45.4% are married, 5.8% are widowed, and 11.7% are divorced.

The median household income in 2016 dollars was $55,783, considered above average for both the city and county. 56.6% of East Dallas homes are detached, single-family houses. The median owner-occupied home value is $231,335. The average household size is 2.38. Homeowners occupied 54.7% of the housing units, and renters occupied the rest.

Education 
East Dallas residents aged 25 and older holding a four-year degree amounted to 23.0% of the population in 2016, considered average when compared with the city and the county as a whole, as were the percentages of residents with a bachelor's or a postgraduate degree.

Public (DISD) 
Grade listings are current as of the 2007-2008 school year.

Elementary schools 
Bayles Elementary School PK-5
Casa View Elementary SchoolPK-5
SS Conner Elementary School PK-5
Paul L. Dunbar Elementary School PK-5
Geneva Heights Elementary School (formerly Robert E. Lee Elementary School) PK-5
Charles A. Gill Elementary School PK-5
Frank Guzick Elementary School PK - 5
Victor H. Hexter Elementary School PK-5
Edwin J. Kiest Elementary School PK-5
Lakewood Elementary School PK-5
William B. Lipscomb Elementary School PK-5
Mockingbird Elementary School (formerly Stonewall Jackson Elementary School) PK-5
Mount Auburn Elementary School PK-3
Martha Turner Reilly Elementary School PK-5
Eduardo Mata Elementary School 4-5
Reinhardt Elementary SchoolPK-5
Oran M. Roberts Elementary School PK-5
Edna Rowe Elementary School PK - 5
Alex Sanger Elementary School PK-5
Larry Smith Elementary PK-5
George Truett Elementary School PK-5

Middle schools 
W.H. Gaston Middle School 6-8
Alex Sanger Preparatory school6-8
Robert T. Hill Middle School 6-8
Harold Wendell Lang Sr. Middle School 6-8
J.L. Long Middle School 6-8 Site

High schools 
Bryan Adams High School 9-12
Woodrow Wilson High School 9-12

Private 
Bishop Lynch High School 9-12

Higher education
Baylor College of Dentistry

References

External links 

 

Geography of Dallas